Henry Howard Starkweather was born in Preston, Connecticut, on April 29, 1826, and died on January 28, 1876, while serving in office as a member of the United States Congress.

Biography 
His parents were John Starkweather and Lydia (Button) Starkweather of Preston, Connecticut.  His father served in the War of 1812 as a private in Captain Isaac Nelsons Company. Henry was a first cousin to Brig. General John Converse Starkweather.

Henry served in the Connecticut Legislature in 1856 and was a delegate from Connecticut to the 1860 Republican National Convention, which nominated Abraham Lincoln, and to the 1868 Republican National Convention, which named Ulysses S. Grant.  He was chairman of the Republican State Committee of Connecticut and a member of the National Republican executive committee. He was appointed postmaster of Norwich, Connecticut, in 1861 by Abraham Lincoln, and was reappointed by President Andrew Johnson again in 1865.  He resigned in 1866 and was elected to US Congress in 1867 and served until he died in office in 1876.

See also
List of United States Congress members who died in office (1790–1899)

References

External links

Henry Howard Starkweather. findagrave.com

1826 births
1876 deaths
Republican Party members of the Connecticut House of Representatives
Connecticut postmasters
People from Preston, Connecticut
Politicians from Norwich, Connecticut
Republican Party members of the United States House of Representatives from Connecticut
19th-century American politicians